Stumptown Comics Fest was a comic book convention, held annually in Portland, Oregon from 2004–2013. In the model of the Alternative Press Expo and the Small Press Expo, Stumptown was a forum for artists, writers and publishers of comic art in its various forms to expose the public to comics not typically accessible through normal commercial channels.

History 
The Stumptown Comics Fest originated in early 2004 with a small group of Portland-area cartoonists (led by Indigo Kelleigh) who yearned for a convention that focused on the art of comics instead of the business of comics. In a space of four months they were able to put on the first comics fest on June 6, 2004, at the Old Church, a non-profit organization whose goal was to preserve an old church. The first show featured 22 exhibitor tables, and attracted 150 attendees.

In 2005 the show moved to  Portland State University's Smith Memorial Ballroom, and grew to 80 exhibitor tables and 450 attendees.

In 2006 the event moved to the Oregon Convention Center and expanded to two days.

In 2007, the event began hosting the Stumptown Comics Fest Trophy Awards and Comic Art Battle. The awards honored outstanding small creators and comics, while the Comic Art Battle was described as "a cross between Pictionary and wrestling."

In 2012 the show changed hands, with Kelleigh passing on the reins to Shawna Gore; in addition, the new organizers achieved nonprofit status.

After the 10th annual show in 2013, Stumptown went "on hiatus" and entered an operating agreement with Rose City Comic Con.

Dates and locations

References

External links

 

Defunct comics conventions
Minicomics
501(c)(3) organizations
Recurring events established in 2004
2004 establishments in Oregon
2013 disestablishments in Oregon
Annual events in Portland, Oregon
Conventions in Oregon